María Gabriela Chávez Colmenares (born 12 March 1980) is a Venezuelan journalist, currently Alternate Ambassador of Venezuela to the United Nations. She is the daughter of former President Hugo Chávez, and acted as his First Lady after his separation from Marisabel Rodríguez in 2003.

Biography
María Gabriela Chávez is the youngest of the three children that Hugo Chávez had during his first marriage with Nancy Colmenares. She enrolled at the Central University of Venezuela majoring in International Studies, but transferred to Social Communication after her sixth semester when she had a problem with a teacher. She graduated as a social communicator at the Bolivarian University of Venezuela, although she has not formally practiced the profession.

On 12 April 2002, during the coup d'état attempt, after the military announced that President Chávez had resigned and transferred him to the  base outside of Caracas, María Gabriela was the first person whom Chávez phoned; their conversation was captured by the Associated Press. She contacted several journalists to report that a coup was taking place. According to statements by Fidel Castro in the Cuban newspaper Granma, he advised her to declare to the international media that Chávez had not resigned from the presidency, saying that "Then I immediately prepared her to speak with Randy the journalist, and at 12:40 we fired off (her message) on the air (...) and we delivered it to the agencies and CNN." On the same day, María Gabriela Chávez offered a telephone interview to the Cuban journalist Randy Alonso.

Like Zulemita Menem and Keiko Fujimori, she assumed the role of First Lady of Venezuela after her father divorced, accompanying him on trips and at official events. During the 17th Ibero-American Summit of Heads of State and Government, held in Santiago, Chile from 8 to 10 November 2007, she participated in the First Ladies' agenda. On 13 August 2014, she was appointed as Alternate Ambassador of Venezuela to the United Nations.

Controversies

On 7 August 2015, Diario Las Américas published an article on its website entitled "María Gabriela Chávez podría ser la mujer más rica de Venezuela" (María Gabriela Chávez Could Be the Richest Woman in Venezuela). In it, the newspaper said that Chávez holds $4.197 billion in her bank accounts in Andorra and the United States, more than Venezuelan businessmen such as Lorenzo Mendoza and Gustavo Cisneros. On 10 August 2015, Eva Golinger sent a letter to Diario Las Américas acting as Chávez's lawyer, demanding that the newspaper "desist from defamation of the character and reputation" of her client and "issue a complete and just retraction (...) of any defamatory assertion," affirming that Chávez was a victim of defamation and that she had suffered damages from the article.

María Gabriela Chávez is banned from entering  neighboring Colombia. The Colombian government maintains a list of people banned from entering the country or subject to expulsion; as of January 2019, the list had 200 people with a "close relationship and support for the Nicolás Maduro regime".

References

1980 births
Central University of Venezuela alumni
First Ladies of Venezuela
Living people
People from Barinas (state)
Venezuelan diplomats
Venezuelan women journalists
21st-century Venezuelan women politicians
21st-century Venezuelan politicians